Elections to Kesteven County Council were held on Saturday, 9 April 1949. Kesteven was one of three divisions of the historic county of Lincolnshire in England; it consisted of the ancient wapentakes (or hundreds) of Aswardhurn, Aveland, Beltisloe, Boothby Graffoe, Flaxwell, Langoe, Loveden, Ness, and Winnibriggs and Threo. The Local Government Act 1888 established Kesteven as an administrative county, governed by a Council; elections were held every three years from 1889, until it was abolished by the Local Government Act 1972, which established Lincolnshire County Council in its place.

For the 1949 election, the county was divided into sixty wards, ten of which accounted for the town of Grantham, five for Stamford, three for Sleaford and two for Bourne. Every seat in Grantham was contested, but all of the nominated candidates for the towns of Bourne, Sleaford and Stamford were returned unopposed. The majority of the councillors returned were independents.

Results

Ancaster

Bassingham

Bennington

Billingborough

Billinghay

Bourne no. 1

Bourne no. 2

Bracebridge

Branston

Bytham

Caythorpe

Claypole

Colsterworth

Corby

Cranwell

Deeping St James

Dunston

Gonerby and Barrowby

Grantham no. 1

Grantham no. 2

Grantham no. 3

Grantham no. 4

Grantham no. 5

Grantham no. 6

Grantham no. 7

Grantham no. 8

Grantham no. 9

Grantham no. 10

Heckington

Helpringham

Kyme

Leadenham

Market Deeping

Martin

Metheringham

Morton

Navenby

North Hykeham

Osbournby

Ponton

N.B. Nomination papers were also received for John A. Widdowson, but were deemed invalid.

Rippingale

Ropsley

Ruskington

Scopwick

Skellingthorpe

Sleaford no. 1

Sleaford no. 2

Sleaford no. 3

Stamford no. 1

Stamford no. 2

Stamford no. 3

Stamford no. 4

Stamford no. 5

Swinderby

Thurlby

Uffington

Washingborough

Welby

Wilsford

Woolsthorpe

References

1949
Kesteven County Council election
20th century in Lincolnshire
Kesteven County Council election